Cernuella cisalpina, sometimes known as the "maritime gardensnail", is a species of small air-breathing land snail, a terrestrial pulmonate gastropod mollusk in the family Geomitridae. 

This is a small snail with a white and brown striped shell.

This species creates and uses love darts in its mating behavior.

References

External links
 AnimalBase
 image

Geomitridae
Gastropods described in 1837